The Docklands Light Railway (DLR) is an automated light metro system that serves the London Docklands area of east and south-east London. First opened on 31 August 1987, the DLR was a key component in the regeneration of large areas of disused industrial land into valuable commercial and residential districts.

Stations are in the City of London and the boroughs of Newham, Tower Hamlets, Greenwich and Lewisham with the majority of the network north of the River Thames. Of the 45 stations, four are underground: Woolwich Arsenal, Island Gardens, Bank and Cutty Sark (for Maritime Greenwich).



Stations and routes 
Listed for each station is the branch or branches it is on, the local authority, the London Travelcard zone in which it is located, interchanges with other modes of transport, the opening date and any resiting.

Four stations have direct interchanges with London Underground lines: Bank (Central, Circle, District, Northern and Waterloo & City), Canning Town (Jubilee), West Ham (Hammersmith & City, Jubilee and District lines) and Stratford (Central and Jubilee). There are indirect interchanges at Canary Wharf and Heron Quays (for Jubilee line from Canary Wharf), Bow Church (for District and Hammersmith & City lines from Bow Road) and Tower Gateway (for Circle and District lines from Tower Hill). There are interchanges with London Overground at Stratford (direct) and Shadwell (indirect). There are interchanges with National Rail at Greenwich, Lewisham, Limehouse, Woolwich Arsenal, Stratford, West Ham and Stratford International.

List

Planned stations 
There is currently two planned projects that will add stations to the DLR network - a new station at Thames Wharf and an extension to Thamesmead.

Safeguarded stations
As part of the development of the Docklands Light Railway, several sites were safeguarded for future station construction, some of which have been implemented.

Previously safeguarded

Two stations were safeguarded as part of the initial construction of the railway in the 1980s.

 Pudding Mill Lane, located alongside the Great Eastern Main Line between Stratford and Bow Church. The station opened in 1996.
 Langdon Park, located between All Saints and Devons Road. Planned as "Carmen Street", the station opened in 2007.

No longer proposed

 Thames Wharf, located south of Canning Town, was safeguarded during the construction of the Beckton extension. Given construction of flying junctions for access to the Stratford International and Woolwich Arsenal branches of the DLR, construction of this station is no longer possible. A new safeguarded site for a Thames Wharf station was constructed as part of the London City Airport extension.
 Connaught, located on a straight section of viaduct between Prince Regent and Royal Albert stations, was safeguarded during the construction of the Beckton extension in the 1990s. The site was close to the long closed Connaught Road station. Although a straight section of viaduct remains, the station is not currently proposed, despite recent development in the local area such as ExCeL London and London Regatta Centre.

Currently proposed

 Thames Wharf was safeguarded as part of the London City Airport extension, with a straight section of viaduct. The site is currently being used for Silvertown Tunnel construction. Following completion of the tunnel in 2025, 5,000 new homes and a DLR station will be built.

Notes

See also 
 List of London railway stations
 List of London Underground stations
 List of former and unopened London Underground stations
 :Category:Railway stations in London by borough

Footnotes

References

External links
 Docklands Light Railway – Transport for London

Stations
Docklands Light Railway
 
London transport-related lists
Lists of metro stations